Ordinary is an unincorporated community in Elliott County, Kentucky.

References

Unincorporated communities in Elliott County, Kentucky
Unincorporated communities in Kentucky